Infinite energy may refer to:

 Infinite Energy (magazine), a bi-monthly alternative energy magazine 
Perpetual motion, a device or system that delivers more energy than was put into it
 Infinite Energy (company), an energy provider in Florida
 Anant Virya ("infinite energy" or "perfect power"), a characteristic of the soul in Jainism
 The behaviours of a German Shorthaired Pointer

See also
Free energy suppression, a conspiracy theory that says that technology that could produce unlimited energy is being suppressed by special interest groups